Oreofraga morrisiana is a species of flowering plant in the family Apiaceae, and the only species in the genus Oreofraga. It is found only on Socotra, Yemen. Its natural habitat is rocky areas.

References

Endemic flora of Socotra
Vulnerable plants
Taxonomy articles created by Polbot
Apioideae
Monotypic Apioideae genera